America 24/7 was a photography book published by DK in 2003 about culture and life in the United States. It depicts life of Americans from every U.S. State.

Collecting
Between May 12–18, 2003, digital photographers were asked to take pictures of cities and towns, friends, neighbors, families and animals. More than 25,000 photographers responded. Photographers ranged from first-time users to international photojournalists and newspaper shooters. Included in these were 36 Pulitzer Prize winners.

Project
The  project was created by Rick Smolan and David Elliot Cohen, the team behind the New York Times #1 Bestseller: A Day in the Life of America.

References

External links
America 24/7 Official site

Photographic collections and books
2003 non-fiction books
American culture
Entertainment in the United States
DK (publisher) books